Odostomia unidentata is a species of sea snail, a marine gastropod mollusk in the family Pyramidellidae, the pyrams and their allies.

Description
The almost opaque, glossy, white shell is solid. The length measures 5 mm. The protoconch has a helicoid shape. The teleoconch contains six, flattened whorls  with a narrow, distinct suture. The shell has a more or less distinct peripheral angle, visible also at the base of the upper whorls. The sculpture  has slight, microscopical, close-set spiral striae and prosocline growth lines. The umbilicus is lacking, although there is sometimes a small chink.  The aperture has a straight columellar border. The columellar tooth is long and prominent.

Distribution
This species has a wide distribution and occurs in the following locations:
 European waters (ERMS scope)
 British Isles
 Goote Bank
 Irish Exclusive economic Zone
 Portuguese Exclusive Economic Zone
 Spanish Exclusive Economic Zone
 United Kingdom Exclusive Economic Zone
 Atlantic Ocean : Arctic region to the Azores, Madeira, Canary Islands,  North Carolina to the Florida Keys, USA ; Northeast Brazil
 Western Mediterranean Sea (Greece)

References

External links
 To Biodiversity Heritage Library (95 publications)
 To CLEMAM
 To Encyclopedia of Life
 To Marine Species Identification Portal
 To ITIS
 To World Register of Marine Species
 

unidentata
Gastropods described in 1803